Darío Javier Franco Gatti  (born 17 January 1969) is an Argentine football manager and former international footballer. He is the current manager of Gimnasia Jujuy.

Playing career

Club
Franco made his football debut in his native country, briefly playing with Newell's Old Boys before joining Spain's Real Zaragoza winning the 1994 Copa del Rey Final and the following season the 1995 UEFA Cup Winners' Cup Final against incumbent Champions and heavy favourites Arsenal F.C. He arrived in Mexico in 1995 to play for Atlas. After three years with the club, he was transferred to Monarcas Morelia, where he won the 2000 championship.

International
He played also for Argentina's national team, and scored two goals in the 1991 Copa América, which Argentina won. In the 1993 edition he was selected to replace the banned Claudio Caniggia, but was seriously injured in Argentina's first match.

Managerial career
After his playing career ended, Franco became the manager of Tecos UAG. The president of the club fired him on Saturday August 18, 2007 after Tecos lost 4-1 to Pachuca in their first game of the season and were then beaten 3-0 by Atlante F.C. in their third game. The only point he earned came from a 0-0 draw against Chivas de Guadalajara in the second game. In Clausura 2009, Franco managed Atlas. After their second game, a 4-0 defeat to Cruz Azul, Franco was fired and was replaced by Ricardo La Volpe.

Between 2010 and 2013, Franco managed San Martín de San Juan and Instituto. In 2013, Franco signed a contract with Universidad de Chile, but he was fired after six months. He managed Aldosivi in 2013 and Defensa y Justicia in 2014. He departed Defensa y Justicia in 2015 and subsequently became manager of Colón. In 2016, after leaving Colón, he returned to Aldosivi to become the club's manager for the second time. He rejoined Instituto de Córdoba on 1 November 2017.

Personal life
His son Emiliano Franco is a footballer.

References

External links
 
 
 Club Atlético Monarcas 
 Profile at LFP.es
 Darío Franco at Soccerway
 Darío Franco at Footballdatabase

1969 births
Living people
Sportspeople from Córdoba Province, Argentina
Argentine emigrants to Mexico
Naturalized citizens of Mexico
Association football defenders
Argentine footballers
Mexican footballers
Argentina international footballers
Argentine Primera División players
Liga MX players
La Liga players
Newell's Old Boys footballers
Real Zaragoza players
Atlas F.C. footballers
Atlético Morelia players
1991 Copa América players
1993 Copa América players
Copa América-winning players
Argentine expatriate footballers
Argentine expatriate sportspeople in Spain
Expatriate footballers in Spain
Argentine football managers
Argentine expatriate football managers
Mexican football managers
Expatriate football managers in Chile
Atlético Morelia managers
Tecos F.C. managers
Atlas F.C. managers
Instituto managers
San Martín de San Juan managers
Universidad de Chile managers
Aldosivi managers
Defensa y Justicia managers
Club Atlético Colón managers
C.D. Olmedo managers